Marie-Louise Colomb (August 18, 1892 – November 3, 1965), best known by her pseudonym Catherine Colomb, was a Swiss writer, considered one of the most important 19th-century novelists in French-speaking Switzerland.

Early life and education 
Marie-Louise Colomb was born in 1892 in Saint-Prex, in the Swiss canton of Vaud. Her mother died in childbirth when she was 5 years old, and she was raised by her maternal grandmother. After spending her childhood in Begnins, she left to study at the University of Lausanne, where she graduated in 1916 with a degree in classical studies. She began work on a doctorate, with a thesis on Béat Louis de Muralt, but she abandoned it before the defense.

Career 
Colomb traveled at length to Germany, England, and Paris, before settling again in Vaud. She would spend the rest of her life in the canton—whose landscapes and social elite would inspire her novels—living in turn in Yverdon-les-Bains, Lausanne, and Prilly. She married Jean Raymond, a lawyer, in 1921, and had two sons in 1923 and 1929.

For nearly 30 years, Colomb set aside her literary ambitions to focus on the demands of family and social life. But she began to write in secret in the early 1930s, beginning the day her younger son entered school. Her first novel, Pile ou face, was published under the pseudonym Catherine Tissot in 1935.

Colomb went on to publish her three best-known novels, Château en enfance, Les Esprits de la terre, and Le temps des anges, at 10-year intervals under the pseudonym Catherine Colomb. Her work was praised by the Swiss poet Gustave Roud and, in France, by Jean Paulhan.

Death and legacy 
Catherine Colomb died in Prilly in 1965. Today, she is considered one of the most important and innovative writers from French-speaking Switzerland of the mid-19th century.

In 2008, the artists of Saint-Prex founded an organization called Association Catherine Colomb to promote her work and cultural events in the area.

Selected works 

 Pile ou face, 1934
 Châteaux en enfance, 1945; republished 1993
 Les Esprits de la terre, 1953; republished 2002
 Le Temps des anges, 1962; republished 1993

Posthumous 

 La Valise, 1993
 Les Royaumes combattants, 1993
 Catherine Colomb, Œuvres complètes, 3 volumes, 1993
 Tout Catherine Colomb, 2019

References 

1892 births
1965 deaths
Swiss women novelists
University of Lausanne alumni
French-language writers